Knarreviksundet is a sound between the island of Litlesotra in Øygarden Municipality and Drotningsvik in Bergen Municipality in Vestland county, Norway. The Sotra Bridge crosses the Knarreviksundet.

Sounds of Vestland
Øygarden
Geography of Bergen